Syed Shafaat Ali is a Pakistani TV host and stand up comedian who is known for his impressions of Pakistani public figures.

Biography 
Ali was born in on 8 February in Peshawar and studied engineering.

In 2006, Ali co-hosted the 4 Man Show. In 2011, Ali co-hosted Banana News Network. Ali started his own show Mere Aziz Ham Watno in which he starred as well.

In 2016, videos of Ali went viral in which he impersonated Imran Khan, Bilawal Bhutto Zardari and Shahbaz Sharif and he became an overnight sensation online.

Ali was a part of Geo Entertainment's Ramadan Transmission "Dil Dil Ramzan".

Ali appeared as Nazar in Geo Entertainment's drama Romeo Weds Heer.

He also became part of the ARY News Special Cricket Program "Har Lamha Purjosh" and he did hilarious mimicry of Bilawal Bhutto, Imran Khan, Shehbaz Sharif, Aftab Iqbal, Azizi and many others.

Shafaat Ali was also in the movie "Parwaaz Hai Junoon", he was shown as a cadet in PAF Academy undergoing flying training.

He is also expected to appear in Faisal Qureshi's upcoming film ''Money Back Guarantee.

Television

References

External links

Living people
Pakistani male comedians
People from Peshawar
Pakistani impressionists (entertainers)
Pakistani male actors
Pakistani television hosts
ARY News newsreaders and journalists
Geo News newsreaders and journalists
1986 births